Zhenghe County is a county of northern Fujian province, People's Republic of China, bordering Zhejiang to the north. It is under the administration of the prefecture-level city of Nanping. The Min-Bei dialect, or Northern Min (Guing'ei Di) prevails in Zhenghe County.

History 
Zhenghe became a county in 1000AD, but its previous name is Guanli. In 1115AD, the emperor appreciated the Gongfu tea from Guanli County. He delightfully named the county after his reign title "Zhenghe", which lasts till now.

Administration

1 Subdistrict 
Xiongshan

4 Towns 
Dongping

Tieshan

Zhenqian

Shuitun

5 Townships 
Xingxi

Waitun

Yangyuan

Chengyuan

Lingyao

Climate

Transportation

Expressway 
 G1514 Ningde-Shangrao Expressway
 G25 Changchun-Shenzhen Expressway
 S0313 Gutian-Zhenghe Expressway

Provincial-level Road 
 S204
 S301
 S302

Specialty 
Zhenghe is most famous for its tea. Zhenghe kung fu tea is among the best kung fu tea. You can either simply drink it or drink it with sugar or milk. There is another kind of famous tea: Baihao Yinzhen.
Zhenghe is also famous for its chestnuts. Zhenghe is the second largest place of production of chestnuts in China.

References

County-level divisions of Fujian
Nanping